1983 Empress's Cup Final was the 5th final of the Empress's Cup competition. The final was played at National Stadium in Tokyo on March 25, 1984. Shimizudaihachi SC won the championship.

Overview
Defending champion Shimizudaihachi SC won their 4th title, by defeating Takatsuki FC 2–0. Shimizudaihachi SC won the title for 4 years in a row.

Match details

See also
1983 Empress's Cup

References

Empress's Cup
1983 in Japanese women's football